Hodgin may refer to:

People
 Emily Caroline Chandler Hodgin (1838-1907), American temperance reformer
 Ralph Hodgin (1915-2011), American baseball player
 Steve Hodgin (born c. 1951), former American football player and coach

Other
 Hodgin Hall, historic building on the University of New Mexico, US

See also
 Hodgins